Tracy (also spelled Tracey, Traci, Tracci, or Tracie, or Trasci), as a British personal name, was originally adopted from Norman surnames such as those of the family de Tracy or de Trasci from Tracy-Bocage in Normandy, France. Derived from the Gaulish male name Draccios, or Latin Thracius ("of Thrace, Thracian"), and the well-identified Celtic suffix -āko ("place, property"), such Norman surnames themselves sprung from several Tracy place-names in France.

The Irish surname Tracey, which may similarly have contributed to the adoption of the English personal name, is derived from the native Irish O'Treasaigh septs. The name is taken from the Irish word "treasach" meaning "war-like" or "fighter". It is also translated as "higher", "more powerful" or "superior". It may also be derived from the Irish word for three, with an association to the Tuatha Dé Danann. The first reference to the surname in the Irish Annals was in 1008: "Gussan, son of Ua Treassach, lord of Ui-Bairrche, died."

Given name

Great Britain
In England and Wales, the name Tracy was not unknown, but unusual, with about two a year, from 1837 until 1955, when, following the success of the American film star Spencer Tracy, the name quite suddenly became very popular, rising to a maximum of 7667 babies being given that name in 1964, but after 1970 the popularity quickly declined to 475 in 1985.

 
 

While the name is unisex, within the United Kingdom it is more generally considered to be a female name. Its popularity peaked during the 1960s, when Tracey was the sixth most popular female name and the alternate spelling Tracy was the 12th most popular in 1964.

People

Surname

Tracy or Tracey
Adrian Tracy (born 1988), American football linebacker 
Albert H. Tracy (1793–1859), US representative from New York
Andrew Tracey (born 1936), ethnomusicologist
Benjamin F. Tracy (1830–1915), United States soldier and politician
Bob Tracy, former American football coach
C. Richard Tracy (born 1943), American ecologist
Chad Tracy (born 1980), American professional baseball third baseman
Chad Tracy (baseball, born 1985), American professional baseball first baseman
Clarissa Tracy (1818–1905), American botanist
Cole Tracy (born 1996), American football player
Craig Tracey (born 1974), British Conservative Party politician, Member of Parliament (MP) for North Warwickshire since 2015
Daniel Tracey (1794–1832), doctor, journalist and Canadian politician
Daniel Tracy (1843–1919), American farmer, businessman, and politician
Doreen Tracey (1943–2018), American actress and writer
Harriet Tracy (1834–1918), American inventor
Hugh Tracey (1903–1977), British ethnomusicologist
Keegan Connor Tracy (born 1971), Canadian actress and author
Marcus Tracy (born 1986), American soccer striker
Margaret Tracey (born 1967), American ballet dancer and educator
Michael Tracy (born 1958), American graffiti artist, known professionally as Tracy 168
Minnie Tracey (1873/1874 – 1929, American high lyric soprano
Paul Tracy (born 1968), professional racing driver
Phineas L. Tracy (1786–1876), US representative from New York
Richard Tracy (died 1569), English Protestant reformer
Sheila Tracy (1934–2014), British broadcaster, writer, musician, and singer 
Spencer Tracy (1900–1967), American actor
Stan Tracey (1926–2013), British jazz pianist 
Uriah Tracy (1755–1807), US representative and senator from Connecticut
William Tracy (1917–1967), American actor
William Tracey (1976–1945), English footballer

Trasci
Ferruccio Baffa Trasci (1590–1656), Italian bishop, theologian and philosopher

De Tracy
Antoine Destutt de Tracy (1754–1836), French Enlightenment philosopher
Victor Destutt de Tracy (1781–1864), French soldier and politician
William de Tracy (or Williame or Guillaume de Tracy) (died ), Anglo-Norman knight who took part in the assassination of Thomas Becket

Given name

Women

Tracey
Tracey Adams (born 1954), American abstract painter and printmaker
Tracey Adams, American pornographic film actress
Tracey Anarella (born 1963), American documentary filmmaker
Tracey Andersson (born 1984), Swedish hammer thrower
Tracey Atkin (born 1971), British swimmer
Tracey Baker-Simmons (born 1967), American television producer
Tracey Baptiste (born 1972), Trinidad and Tobago writer
Tracey Ann Barnes (born 1975), Jamaican sprinter
Tracey Beatty (born 1979), Australian basketball player
Tracey Belbin (born 1967), Australian field hockey player
Tracey Bell, Canadian comedian, impersonator, and impressionist 
Tracey Bernett (born 1955), American politician
Tracey Birdsall (born 1963), American actress
Tracey E. Bregman (born 1963), American actress
Tracey Brindley (born 1972), British mountain runner
Tracey Brown, Canadian country singer
Tracey Brown, British scientist
Tracey D. Brown, American businesswoman
Tracey Browning (born 1963), Australian basketball player
Tracey Challenor, Australian journalist
Tracey Childs (born 1963), English actress
Tracey Collins, American educator
Tracey Conway (born 1956), American actress, comedian, writer, and cardiac health advocate
Tracey Corderoy (born 1965), British children's writer
Tracey Cox (born 1961), English author and columnist
Tracey Crawford (born c. 1970), British television announcer and radio presenter
Tracey Cross (born 1972), Australian Paralympic swimmer
Tracey Crouch (born 1975), British politician
Tracey Curro (born 1963), Australian journalist
Tracey Curtis-Taylor (born 1962), British aviator
Tracey Damigella (born c. 1969), American figure skater
Tracey Davidson (born 1961), English football goalkeeper
Tracey Davis (born 1977), Australian synchronized swimmer
Tracey DeKeyser, Canadian ice hockey player and coach
Tracey Deer (born 1978), Canadian screenwriter, film director, and newspaper publisher
Tracey Dey (born 1943), American pop singer
Tracey Dorow, American basketball player and coach
Tracey Duke, New Zealand association football player
Tracey Edmonds (born 1967), American television producer, television personality, and president and CEO of Edmonds Entertainment Group, Inc.
Tracey Eide (born 1954), American politician
Tracey Ellis, Canadian actress
Tracey Emin (born 1963), English contemporary artist
Tracey Fear (born 1959), Australian-New Zealand netball player
Tracey Ferguson (born 1974), Canadian Paralympic wheelchair basketball player
Tracey Forbes, Canadian television writer and producer
Tracey Freeman (born 1948), Australian Paralympic track and field athlete
Tracey Fuchs (born 1966), American field hockey player
Tracey Gaudry (born 1969), Australian sport administrator, cyclist, and businesswoman
Tracey Gloster, British chemist
Tracey Gold (born 1969), American actress
Tracey Greenwood, American fitness competitor
Tracey Hall, American basketball player
Tracey Hallam (born 1975), English badminton player
Tracey Hannah (born 1988), Australian downhill cyclist
Tracey Herd (born 1968), Scottish poet
Tracey Hiete (born 1971), American tennis player
Tracey Hinton (born 1970), British Paralympic track and field athlete
Tracey Holloway, American scientist and academic
Tracey Holmes, Australian journalist and presenter
Tracey Hoyt (born 1950), Canadian voice actress
Tracey Jackson (born 1958), American author, blogger, screenwriter, film director, and producer
Tracey Jackson, American talent agent
Tracey Ann Jacobson (born 1965), American politician
Tracey Johnston-Aldworth (born 1957), Canadian businesswoman and entrepreneur
Tracey Kelliher, Irish singer and songwriter, known professionally as Tracey K
Tracey Ann Kelly, American television soap opera writer
Tracey Lambrechs (born 1985), New Zealand weightlifter
Tracey Larson (born 1978), American field hockey player
Tracey Leone (born 1967), American soccer player
Tracey Lewis, Australian Paralympic swimmer
Tracey Lindberg, Canadian writer, scholar, lawyer, and Indigenous Rights activist
Tracey MacLeod (born 1960), English journalist and broadcaster
Tracey Magee (born 1969), Irish journalist and broadcaster
Tracey Martin (born 1964), New Zealand politician
Tracey McClure, American journalist
Tracey McDermott, British businesswoman
Tracey McFarlane (born 1966), Canadian-American swimmer
Tracey McIntosh, New Zealand sociologist, criminologist, and academic
Tracey McLauchlan (born 1979), New Zealand table tennis player
Tracey McLellan (born 1970), New Zealand politician
Tracey Meares, American legal scholar and author
Tracey Medeiros, American chef and cookbook author
Tracey Melesko, Canadian Paralympic sprint and long jumper
Tracey Menzies, Australian swimming coach
Tracey Miller (1954–2005), American radio personality, editorial writer, and newspaper editor
Tracey Moberly (born 1964), Welsh artist, author, and radio show host
Tracey Moffatt (born 1960), Australian artist
Tracey Moore (born 1960), Canadian voice actress and voice director
Tracey Morris (born 1967), British long-distance runner
Tracey Morton-Rodgers (born 1967), Australian tennis player
Tracey Mosley (born 1973), Australian softball player
Tracey Needham (born 1967), American actress
Tracey Neuls, Canadian shoe designer
Tracey Neville (born 1977), English netball player and coach
Tracey Nicolaas (born 1987), Aruban model and Miss Universe participant
Tracey Norman (born 1952), American model
Tracey O'Connor (born 1982), New Zealand tennis player
Tracey Oliver (born 1975), Australian Paralympic swimmer
Tracey Pemberton (born 1981), Australian netball player
Tracey Perry, Canadian politician
Tracey Pettengill Turner (born c. 1971), American serial social entrepreneur
Tracey Poirier, American National Guard colonel
Tracey Porter, American children's author
Tracey Ramsey (born 1971), Canadian politician
Tracey Reynolds (born 1970s), British sociologist and professor
Tracey Richardson (born 1982), British diver
Tracey Roberts (1914/1915–2002), American actress and acting coach
Tracey Roberts, English-American politician
Tracey Rogers, Australian marine ecologist
Tracey Rose (born 1974), South African artist
Tracey Ross (born 1959), American actress
Tracey Rouault, American rheumatologist and physician
Tracey Rowland (born 1963), Australian Roman Catholic theologian and professor
Tracey Seaward (born 1965), English film producer
Tracey Shelton, Australian journalist
Tracey Shors, American neuroscientist and professor
Tracey Skoyles (born 1967), Irish cricketer
Tracey Slaughter (born 1972), New Zealand writer and poet
Tracey Snelling (born 1970), American artist
Tracey Spicer, Australian journalist and social justice advocate
Tracey Stern, American television writer and producer
Tracey Tan (born 1976), Singaporean sailor
Tracey Tawhiao (born 1967), New Zealand artist
Tracey Thomson, American television soap opera writer
Tracey Thorn (born 1962), English singer, songwriter and writer
Tracey Trench, American film producer
Tracey Ullman (born 1959), English-born actress, comedian, singer, dancer, screenwriter, producer, director, author and businesswoman
Tracey Vallois, American politician
Tracey Waddleton (born 1979), Canadian writer
Tracey Wainman (born 1967), Canadian figure skater
Tracey Waters (born 1973), New Zealand rugby union player
Tracey Weldon, American linguist
Tracey West (born 1965), American children's author
Tracey Wheeler (born 1967), Australian football goalkeeper
Tracey Wickham (born 1962), Australian swimmer
Tracey Wigfield (born 1983), American television writer

Tracey Wigginton (born 1965), Australian murderer
Tracey Wilkinson, English actress
Tracey Scott Wilson, American playwright, television writer, television producer, and screenwriter
Tracey Witch of Ware, English show dog

Traci
Traci Hunter Abramson, American mystery and suspense novelist
Traci Bartlett (born 1972), Australian soccer player
Traci Bingham (born 1968), American actress, model, and television personality
Traci D. Blackmon, American minister
Traci Braxton (1971–2022), American singer, reality television personality, and radio personality
Traci Brimhall, American poet and professor
Tracy Brookshaw (born 1975), Canadian professional wrestler, professional wrestling valet, and professional wrestling referee, known by the ring name Traci Brooks
Traci Chee, American author
Traci Conrad-Fischer (born 1970s), American softball player and coach
Traci Des Jardins (born 1965), American chef and restaurateur
Traci Dinwiddie (born 1973), American film and television actress
Traci Falbo, American long-distance runner
Traci Gere, American politician
Traci Hale, American pop and R&B songwriter and vocalist
Traci Harding (born 1964), Australian novelist
Traci Houpapa (born 1965/1966), company director and business advisor
Traci Paige Johnson (born 1969), American animator, television producer, and voice actress
Traci Koster (born 1985), American attorney and politician
Traci Kueker-Murphy, American United States Air Force brigadier general
Traci Lind (born 1968), American film actress
Traci Loader (born 1970), Canadian make-up artist
Traci Lords (born 1968), American actress, singer, model, writer, producer, and director
Traci Melchor, Canadian television personality
Traci Park, American attorney and politician
Traci Phillips (born 1964), American sprint canoer
Traci L. Slatton (born 1963), American author and columnist
Traci Sorell, American author
Traci Stumpf (born 1986), American TV host, stand-up comedian, and actress
Traci Wolfe (born 1960), American film actress and model

Tracie
Tracie O. Afifi, Canadian research scientist
Tracie Andrews (born 1969), convicted murderer
Tracie Bennett (born 1961), English actress
Tracie Collins (born 1975), actress, writer, theatre director, and producer
Tracie C. Collins, American academic, physician, and government official
Tracie Davis (born 1970), American politician and teacher
Tracie D. Hall, American librarian, author, curator, and advocate for the arts
Tracie Howard, African-American writer of fiction
Tracie Laymon, American actress, screenwriter, producer and film director
Tracie McAra (born 1960), Canadian basketball player
Tracie Joy McBride (1975–1995), American murder victim
Tracie McGovern (born 1978), Australian international football player
Tracie Morris, American poet and performer
Tracie Peterson (born 1959), American author of Christian fiction
Tracie Ruiz (born 1963), American synchronized swimmer
Tracie Savage (born 1962), American actress and journalist
Tracie Simpson, British television producer
Tracie Spencer (born 1976), American singer
Tracie Thomas (born 1965), American musician
Tracie Thoms (born 1975), American actress and singer
Tracie Chima Utoh, Nigerian playwright and professor
Tracie Young (born 1965), British singer

Tracy
Tracy Ackerman, British singer and songwriter
Tracy Adams, American medievalist
Tracy Ainsworth, Australian marine biologist and professor
Tracy Akiror (born 1997), Ugandan footballer
Tracy Allard (born 1971), Canadian politician
Tracy Alloway, American journalist and podcaster
Tracy Almeda-Singian (born 1979), American tennis player
Tracy Anderson (born 1975), American fitness entrepreneur and author
Tracy Arnold (born 1962), American actress
Tracy Ashton, American actress
Tracy Atiga, New Zealand rugby union player and franchise owner
Tracy Austin (born 1962), American tennis player
Tracy Axten (born 1963), English discus thrower
Tracy Baim, American journalist, author, and filmmaker
Tracy Bale, American neuroscientist and molecular biologist
Tracy M. Barker (born 1957), American herpetologist
Tracy Barlow (born 1985), British long-distance runner
Tracy Barnes (born 1982), American biathlete
Tracy Barrell (born 1974), Australian Paralympic swimmer
Tracy Barrett, American author
Tracy Bartram, Australian comedian, radio personality, and podcaster
Tracy Berno, New Zealand academic
Tracy Bonham (born 1967), American alternative rock musician
Tracy Borman (born 1972), English historian and author
Tracy-Lee Botha (born 1988), South African lawn bowler
Tracy L. Boyland (born 1968), American politician
Tracy Brabin (born 1961), British politician
Tracy Britt Cool (born 1984), American business executive and entrepreneur
Tracy Brogan, American author
Tracy Brook (born 1971), Australian figure skater
Tracy Brown (born 1974), American author
Tracy Brown-May (born 1967), American politician
Tracy Byrd (born 1964), American boxer
Tracy Byrnes (born 1970), American television business news anchor, journalist, and accountant
Tracy Caldwell Dyson (born 1969), American chemist and astronaut
Tracy Cameron (born 1975), Canadian rower
Tracy Camp (born 1964), American computer scientist
Tracy Caulkins (born 1963), American swimmer
Tracy Chamoun (born 1960), Lebanese author, diplomat, and political activist
Tracy Chapman (born 1964), American singer-songwriter
Tracy Nicole Chapman, American stage actress
Tracy Chevalier (born 1962), American-British novelist
Tracy Chou (born 1987), American software engineer and advocate for diversity in technological fields
Tracy Chu (born 1988), Hong Kong-Canadian actress, television presenter, and barrister
Tracy Claxton (born 1961/1962), American basketball player
Tracy Clayton (born 1982/1983), American writer and journalist
Tracy Cohen, Canadian television producer
Tracy Coogan, Irish actress
Tracy Cortez (born 1993), American mixed martial artist
Tracy Coster, Australian country singer
Tracy Cox-Smyth (born 1966), Zimbabwean springboard diver
Tracy Dahl (born 1961), Canadian soprano singer
Tracy Dares, Canadian pianist
Tracy Daszkiewicz (born 1973), English public health worker
Tracy Davidson, American news presenter
Tracy Davidson-Celestine (born 1978), Tobagonian politician
Tracy Davis (born 1962), Australian politician
 Tracy Dawber (born 1966), English pedophile convicted in the 2009 Plymouth child abuse case
 Tracy Dawes-Gromadzki (born 1972), Australian ecologist
 Tracy Dawson (born 1983), Canadian actress, comedian, and writer
 Tracy Dempsey (born 1950), American politician
 Tracy Dennis-Tiwary (born 1973), American clinical psychologist, author, health technology entrepreneur, and professor
 Tracy Deonn, American author
 Tracy Dockray (born 1962), American artist and children's novel illustrator
 Tracy Drain, American NASA engineer
 Tracy Ducar (born 1973), American soccer goalkeeper
 Tracy Duncan (born 1971), Canadian rower
 Tracy Edser (born 1982), South African photojournalist and documentary producer
 Tracy Edwards (born 1962), British sailor
 Tracy Ehlert, American politician
 Tracy Eisser (born 1989), American rower
 Tracy Emblem (born 1955), American attorney and politician
 Tracy Evans (born 1967), American freestyle skier
 Tracy Eyrl-Shortland, New Zealand netball player
 Tracy Flannigan, American filmmaker
 Tracy Fleury (born 1986), Canadian curler
 Tracy Freundt (born 1985), Peruvian model
 Tracy Fullerton (born 1965), American game designer, educator, and writer
 Tracy Gahan (born 1980), American basketball player
 Tracy Garneau, Canadian ultramarathoner
 Tracy L. Garrett, American United States Marine Corps major general
 Tracy Goddard (born 1969), British track and field athlete
 Tracy Grammer (born 1968), American folk singer
Tracy Grandstaff, American voice actress, writer, consultant, production assistant, and singer
Tracy Grant Lord, New Zealand scenographer and costume designer
Tracy Gray (born 1969/1970), Canadian politician
Tracy Griffith (born 1965), American actress, sushi chef, and painter
Tracy Grimshaw (born 1960), Australian journalist and television presenter
Tracy Grose, American soccer player and coach
Tracy Hamlin, American singer-songwriter
Tracy Hanson (born 1971), American golfer
Tracy Harris (born 1958), American artist
Tracy Harvey, Australian comedian, television presenter, actor, and writer
Tracy Maxwell Heard (born 1963), American politician
Tracy Henderson (born 1974), American basketball player
Tracy A. Henke, American politician
Tracy Higgs (born 1970), self-described psychic medium
Tracy Hitchings (born 1969), English musician
Tracy Hogg (1960–2004), British nurse and author
Tracy Huang (born 1951), Taiwanese singer
Tracy Hutson, American reality television personality
Tracy Hyde (born 1959), British actress and model
Tracy Ifeachor, British actress
Tracy Ip (born 1981), Hong Kong actress and model
Tracy Camilla Johns, American film actress
Tracy L. Johnson, American biologist
Tracy L. Kahn, American citrus scientist
Tracy Keenan Wynn (born 1945), American screenwriter and producer
Tracy Keith-Matchitt (born 1990), New Zealand-Cook Islands swimmer
Tracy Kendler (1918–2001), American research psychologist
Tracy Kennedy, Canadian curler
Tracy Kerdyk (born 1966), American golfer
Tracy Kraft-Tharp, American politician and teacher
Tracy Krumm, American textile artist, craft educator, and curator
Tracy Langlands (born 1970), British rower
Tracy LaQuey Parker, Canadian-American businesswoman
Tracy Lee (born 1985), Malaysian actress and television host
Tracy Lemon (1970–2012), New Zealand rugby union player
Tracy Li (born 1972), South African ballet dancer
Tracy Lin (born 1986), American tennis player
Tracy Little (born 1985), Canadian synchronized swimmer
Tracy Looze (born 1973), Australian track and field athlete
Tracy Thu Luong (born 1987), Vietnamese basketball player
 Tracy Lyons (born 1970), English pedophile convicted in the 2009 Plymouth child abuse case
 Tracy MacCharles (born c. 1963), Canadian politician
 Tracy Mackenna (born 1963), British sculptor and artist
 Tracy Mann (born 1957), Australian actress and voice artist
Tracy Martin, American author
Tracy Mattes (born 1969), American track and field athlete and Humanitarian activist
Tracy McCreery (born 1966), American politician
Tracy McMillan (born 1964), American author and television writer
Tracy-Anne McPhee, Canadian politician
Tracy Medve, Canadian airline executive
Tracy Melchior (born 1970), American author and actress
Tracy Middendorf (born 1970), American television, movie, and stage actress
Tracy Miller (born 1966), American painter
Tracy Mills (born 1962), Canadian volleyball player
Tracy Moens, American rugby union player
Tracy Montminy (1911–1992), American artist and muralist
Tracy Moore (born 1975), Canadian television journalist and talk show host
Tracy Moseley (born 1979), British racing cyclist
Tracy Mulholland, New Zealand politician
Tracy Mutinhiri, Zimbabwean politician
Tracy Dickinson Mygatt (1885–1973), American writer and pacifist
Tracy Nakayama (born 1974), American artist
Tracy Negoshian (born 1981), American fashion designer
Tracy Nelson (born 1944), American singer
Tracy Nelson (born 1963), American actress and writer
Tracy Newman, American television producer, writer, comedian, and musician
Tracy R. Norris, American Texas National Guard Adjutant General
Tracy Northup (born 1978), American physicist
Tracy-Ann Oberman (born 1966), English actress, playwright, and narrator
Tracy Oliver, American film and television writer, producer, director, and actress
Tracy Lynn Olivera, American actress
Tracy O'Neill, American writer
Tracy Osborn, American soccer player
Tracy Packiam Alloway, American psychologist and professor
Tracy Palmer (born 1967), English biologist and professor
Tracy Pennycuick, American politician
Tracy Perez (born 1993), Filipino model, industrial engineer, and beauty pageant titleholder
Tracy Phillips, New Zealand high jumper
Tracy Piggott (born 1966), British horse jockey and broadcaster
Tracy Pollan (born 1960), American actress
Tracy Posner (born 1962), American businesswoman, animal rights activist, and actress
Tracy Poust, American producer and writer
Tracy Price-Thompson (born 1963), American speaker, novelist, editor, and U.S. Army Engineer Officer
Tracy Quan (born 1977), American writer
Tracy Quint, American politician
Tracy Rector (born 1972), American filmmaker, curator, and arts advocate
Tracy Redies, Canadian actress
Tracy Reed (1942–2012), English actress
Tracy Reed, American actress and model
Tracy Reed, American writer
Tracy Reese (born 1964), American fashion designer
Tracy Reid (born 1976), American basketball player
Tracy Reiner (born 1964), American actress
Tracy Richardson (born 1965), American politician
Tracy Riley (born 1966), New Zealand academic and professor
Tracy Robinson, Jamaican attorney and lecturer
Tracy Ann Route (born 1985), Micronesian swimmer
Tracy-Ann Rowe (born 1985), Jamaican sprinter 
Tracy Rude (born 1968), American rower 
Tracy Ryan (born 1964), Australian poet, novelist, editor, publisher, translator, and academic 
Tracy Ryan (born 1971), Canadian film, television, and stage actress 
Tracy Sachtjen (born 1969), American curler 
Tracy Schmitt, Canadian alpine skier and motivational speaker 
Tracy Scoggins (born 1953/1959), American actress
Tracy Scott (1970–2016), American script supervisor
Tracy Sefl, American political consultant
Tracy Seretean, American filmmaker
Tracy Denean Sharpley-Whiting, American feminist scholar
Tracy Shaw (born 1973), British actress and singer
Tracy Slatyer, Australian physicist
Tracy Smart, Australian physician, medical administrator, and Royal Australian Air Force senior officer
Tracy Smith (born 1945), American runner
Tracy Smith (born 1964), Canadian long jumper
Tracy Smith, American news correspondent
Tracy K. Smith (born 1972), American poet and educator
Tracy Somerset, Duchess of Beaufort (born 1958), British duchess, environmental activist, and actress
Tracy Sorensen, Australian novelist, filmmaker, and academic
Tracy Spencer (born 1962), British Italo disco singer and actress
Tracy Spiridakos (born 1988), Canadian actress
Tracy Splinter (born 1971), German-South African writer who has been missing since 2016
Tracy Staab (born 1963), American judge
Tracy Stalls (born 1984), American volleyball player
Tracy Stone-Manning (born 1965), American environmental policy advisor
Tracy Teal, American bioinformatician
Tracy Tutor (born 1975), American actress, author, real estate agent, and reality television personality
Tracy Velazquez, American politician
Tracy Vilar (born 1968), American actress
Tracy Vo (born 1983), Australian journalist, radio and television news presenter, reporter, and author
Tracy Weber (died 1981), American singer
Tracy Weber, American journalist and reporter
Tracy Wells (born 1971), American actress
Tracy Wiles (born c. 1970), English actress
Tracy Wilson (born 1961), Canadian ice dancer
Tracy Wiscombe (born 1979), Scottish Paralympic swimmer
Tracy Wolfson (born 1975), American sportscaster
Tracy Wormworth (born 1958), American bass guitarist
Tracy Wright (1959–2010), Canadian actress
Tracy Young, American DJ, producer, and remixer
Tracy, British teen singer

Men

Tracey
Tracey Eaton (born 1965), American football player
Tracey Johnson, American baseball player
Tracey Katelnikoff (born 1968), Canadian ice hockey player
Tracey Kelusky (born 1975), Canadian lacrosse player and coach
Tracey Lee (1933–1990), Australian drag queen
Tracey Lee (born 1970), American hip hop artist and entertainment lawyer
Tracey Mann (born 1970s), American businessman and politician
Tracey Moore (1941–2018), English cricketer
Tracey Perkins (born 1968), American football player
Tracey Rosebud (born 1976), American politician
Tracey Walter (born 1947), American character actor

Tracii
Tracii Guns (born 1966), American guitarist and founder of L.A. Guns, Brides of Destruction, and Contraband

Tracy
Tracy Abrams (born 1992), American basketball player
Trace Adkins (born 1962), American country singer, songwriter, and actor
Tracy Andrus (born 1962), American criminologist
Tracy Baker (1891–1975), American baseball player
Tracy Barnes (1911–1972), American CIA senior staff member
Tracy Baskin (born 1965), American middle-distance runner
Tracy Beckman (born 1945), American politician
Tracy Belton (born 1984), American football player
Tracy Boe, American politician
Tracy Byrd (born 1966), American country singer
Tracy Callis, American boxing historian, writer, and journalist
Tracy Campbell Dickson (1868–1936), American United States Army officer
Tracy Y. Cannon (1879–1961), American musician, composer, and musicologist
Tracy Claeys (born 1968), American football coach
Tracy L. Cross (born 1958), American educational psychologist and developmental scientist
Tracy Daugherty, American author
Tracy Delatte (born 1956), American tennis player
Tracy Dildy (born 1966), American basketball coach
Tracy Drake (1864–1939), American hotelier
Tracy Estes (born 1967), American politician
Tracy Ferrie, American musician
Tracy Franz (born 1960), American football player
Tracy Elliot Hazen (1874–1943), American botanist and author
Tracy Gravely (born 1968), Canadian football player
Tracy Greene, American football player
Tracy Grijalva (born 1959), American guitarist best known as Tracy G
Tracy Hall (1919–2008), American physical chemist
Tracy Ham (born 1964), American football player
Tracy Hayworth (born 1967), American football player
Tracy Hickman (born 1955), American best-selling fantasy author
Tracy Hines (born 1972), American auto racing driver and stunt driver
Tracy Holland, American football coach
Tracy Howard (born 1994), American football player
Tracy Howe (born 1952), Canadian musician, singer, and songwriter
Tracy Inglis (1875–1937), New Zealand medical practitioner, war surgeon, and sports administrator
Tracy Inman (born 1961), American dancer, choreographer, and educator
Tracy Jackson (born 1959), American basketball player
Tracy Jaeckel (1905–1969), American fencer
Tracy Johnson (born 1966), American football player
Tracy Jones (born 1961), American baseball player
Tracy Kidder (born 1945), American writer
Tracy King (born 1960), American businessman
Tracy W. King, American United States Marine Corps Major General
Tracy Krohn (born 1954), American entrepreneur and racing driver
Tracy Lawrence (born 1968), American country singer
Tracy Lazenby (born 1959), English rugby league footballer
Tracy Leslie (born 1957), American racing driver
Tracy Letts (born 1965), American playwright, screenwriter, and actor
Tracy R. Lewis, American economist and professor
Tracy Maddux, American music industry executive
 Tracy Marrow (born 1958), given name of American rapper and actor, Ice-T
 Tracy McCleary (died 2003), American jazz musician
Tracy McGrady (born 1979), American basketball player
Tracy W. McGregor (1869–1936), American humanitarian, philanthropist, and civic leader
Tracy Moore (born 1965), American basketball player
Tracy Moresby (1867–1933), New Zealand cricketer
Tracy Morgan (born 1968), American stand-up comedian and actor
Tracy Mpati (born 1992), Belgian footballer
Tracy Murray (born 1971), American basketball player, coach, and color commentator
Tracy Harris Patterson (born 1964), American boxer
Tracy E. Perkins (born 1971), American U.S. Army Sergeant First Class
Tracy Pew (1957–1986), Australian musician
Tracy Philipps (1888–1959), British public servant, soldier, colonial administrator, traveler, journalist, propagandist, conservationist, and secret agent
Tracy Porter (born 1959), American social activist, entrepreneur, and football player
Tracy Porter (born 1986), American football player
Tracy Potter (born 1950), American historian and politician
Tracy Pratt (born 1943), American-Canadian ice hockey player
Tracy Putnam (1894–1975), American neuroscientist
Tracy Read (1961–1987), American racing driver
Tracy Ringolsby (born 1951), American sportswriter
Tracy Robertson (born 1989), American football player
Tracy Rocker (born 1966), American football player and coach
Tracy Rogers (born 1967), American football player
Tracy Rowlett (born 1942), American journalist, news anchor, and managing editor
Tracy Scroggins (born 1969), American football player
Tracy Silverman (born 1960), American violinist, composer, and producer
Tracy Simien (born 1967), American football player and coach
Tracy Smith (born 1966), American baseball player and coach
Tracy Smothers (1962–2020), American wrestler
Tracy Sonneborn (1905–1981), American biologist
Tracy Stafford (born 1948), American politician
Tracy Stallard (1937–2017), American baseball pitcher
Tracy Steele (born 1963), American politician
Tracy Lee Stum, American artist
Tracy Sugarman (1921–2013), American illustrator
Tracy T, rapper
Tracy D. Terrell (1943–1991), American education theorist
Tracy Yerkes Thomas (1899–1983), American mathematician
Tracy A. Thompson, American Chief of Staff of the United States Army Reserve Command
Tracy Thorne-Begland (born 1966), American judge
Tracy Thornton, American steelpan player and musician
Tracy Tormé (born 1959), American screenwriter and television producer
Tracy Trotter, American cinematographer
Tracy Voorhees (1890–1974), American colonel and civil servant
Tracy Walker (born 1995), American football player
Tracy Webster (born 1971), American basketball player and coach
Tracy White (born 1981), American football player
Tracy Williams (born 1964), American basketball player and coach
Tracy Williams (born 1989), American wrestler
Tracy Wilson (born 1989), American football player
Tracy Woodson (born 1962), American baseball player and coach
Tracy Yardley (born 1979), American comic book artist

Fictional characters
 Dick Tracy, a comic-book detective
Tracie X, pro-black artificial intelligence activist. IG: Thuggillicious 
Grandma Tracy, a character in the 1965 Supermarionation TV series Thunderbirds; also her son Jeff and grandsons Scott, Virgil, Alan, Gordon and John, the show's main protagonists
 Tracey De Santa, a character from the video game Grand Theft Auto V
Tracey (EastEnders) from the television series EastEnders
 Tracy, a character in the movie 2009 American comedy film The Hangover
 Tracey McBean, titular character of the Australian television series of the same name
Tracey Sketchit (Kenji), a character in the Pokémon anime and manga series
Tracey Stubbs, a character in the British sitcom Birds of a Feather
Traci 13, a DC Comics heroine
Traci Abbott, a character on the American soap opera, The Young and the Restless
Tracy (Toshinden Character), a character in the Battle Arena Toshinden fighting game series
Tracy Barlow, in the UK soap TV series Coronation Street
Tracy Beaker, eponymous character of British children's drama franchise The Story of Tracy Beaker
Tracy Billings, a character in the 2011 film The Hangover Part II
Tracy Bond, the wife of James Bond
Tracy Flick, main character in the American black comedy film Election
 Tracy Freeland, in the 2003 American drama film Thirteen
 Tracy Hansen in the movie 13 Going on 30 
Tracy Jordan, a character of the TV series 30 Rock
Tracy McConnell, a character of the American sitcom How I Met Your Mother
 Tracy Pollard, a character in the American television series Star Trek: Discovery
Tracy Quartermaine, a character in the ABC soap opera General Hospital
 Tracy Reynolds, a character from the film Like Mike
 Tracy Reznik, a survivor in the video game Identity V
 Tracy Stewart, a character in the television series Teen Wolf
Tracy Strauss, a character in the TV series Heroes
Tracy Tupman, character in Charles Dickens's first novel, The Pickwick Papers
Tracy Turnblad, the main character in the 1988 film Hairspray, and its 2002 musical adaptation (and in turn, its 2007 film adaptation)
 Grace Kelly's character Tracy from the film High Society
 Tracy, in the 1929 film Blackmail
 Tracy, in the cartoon series Jay Jay the Jet Plane
 Tracy, in the video game EarthBound; see Ness (EarthBound)
 Tracy, from the 1929 film Blackmail
 Tracy, a character from the 2010 comedy film Tooth Fairy
 Traycee Banks, in the American teen sitcom television series Malibu, CA

See also 
 Justice Tracy (disambiguation)
 Tracy (disambiguation)

References

External links
 TraceyClann.com

English given names
English feminine given names
English masculine given names
English unisex given names
English-language unisex given names